Adi Shamir (born July 6, 1952) is an Israeli cryptographer. He is a co-inventor of the Rivest–Shamir–Adleman (RSA) algorithm (along with Ron Rivest and Len Adleman), a co-inventor of the Feige–Fiat–Shamir identification scheme (along with Uriel Feige and Amos Fiat), one of the inventors of differential cryptanalysis and has made numerous contributions to the fields of cryptography and computer science.

Education
Born in Tel Aviv, Shamir received a Bachelor of Science (BSc) degree in mathematics from Tel Aviv University in 1973 and obtained his Master of Science (MSc) and Doctor of Philosophy (PhD) degrees in Computer Science from the Weizmann Institute in 1975 and 1977 respectively.

Career and research
After a year as a postdoctoral researcher at the University of Warwick, he did research at Massachusetts Institute of Technology (MIT) from 1977 to 1980 before returning to be a member of the faculty of Mathematics and Computer Science at the Weizmann Institute. Starting from 2006, he is also an invited professor at École Normale Supérieure in Paris.

In addition to RSA, Shamir's other numerous inventions and contributions to cryptography include the Shamir secret sharing scheme, the breaking of the Merkle-Hellman knapsack cryptosystem, visual cryptography, and the TWIRL and TWINKLE factoring devices. Together with Eli Biham, he discovered differential cryptanalysis in the late 1980s, a general method for attacking block ciphers. It later emerged that differential cryptanalysis was already known — and kept a secret — by both IBM and the National Security Agency (NSA).

Shamir has also made contributions to computer science outside of cryptography, such as finding the first linear time algorithm for 2-satisfiability and showing the equivalence of the complexity classes PSPACE and IP.

Awards and honors
Shamir has received a number of awards, including the following:
 the 2002 ACM Turing Award, together with Rivest and Adleman, in recognition of his contributions to cryptography
 the Paris Kanellakis Theory and Practice Award;
 the Erdős Prize of the Israel Mathematical Society,
 the 1986 IEEE W.R.G. Baker Award
 the UAP Scientific Prize
 The Vatican's PIUS XI Gold Medal
 the 2000 IEEE Koji Kobayashi Computers and Communications Award
 the Israel Prize, in 2008, for computer sciences.
 an honorary DMath (Doctor of Mathematics) degree from the University of Waterloo
 2017 (33rd) Japan Prize in the field of Electronics, Information and Communication for his contribution to information security through pioneering research on cryptography 
 he was elected a Foreign Member of the Royal Society (ForMemRS) in 2018 for substantial contribution to the improvement of natural knowledge.
He was elected a Member of the American Philosophical Society in 2019.

References

1952 births
Living people
People from Tel Aviv
Alumni of the University of Warwick
Tel Aviv University alumni
Modern cryptographers
Public-key cryptographers
Israeli Jews
Israel Prize in computer sciences recipients
20th-century Israeli  mathematicians
21st-century Israeli mathematicians
Israeli computer scientists
Turing Award laureates
Israeli cryptographers
Academic staff of Weizmann Institute of Science
Members of the Israel Academy of Sciences and Humanities
Members of the French Academy of Sciences
Foreign associates of the National Academy of Sciences
Jewish scientists
International Association for Cryptologic Research fellows
Foreign Members of the Royal Society
Members of the American Philosophical Society
Erdős Prize recipients